Okanagan North was a federal electoral district in the province of British Columbia, Canada, that was represented in the House of Commons of Canada from 1979 to 1988.

This riding was created in 1976 from parts of Kamloops—Cariboo, Okanagan Boundary and Okanagan—Kootenay ridings. It was abolished in 1987 when it was redistributed into Okanagan Centre and Okanagan—Shuswap ridings.

It consisted of the North Okanagan Regional District and part of the Central Okanagan Regional District lying east of Electoral Area G and Electoral Area H. It became part of Okanagan Centre in 1987

Members of Parliament

Election results

See also 
 List of Canadian federal electoral districts
 Past Canadian electoral districts

External links 
Riding history from the Library of Parliament

Former federal electoral districts of British Columbia